Trust: America's Best Chance is a book written by Pete Buttigieg, the former Mayor of South Bend, Indiana and former 2020 Democratic presidential candidate. The book was published by Liveright Publishing on October 6, 2020.

Summary 
In the book, Pete Buttigieg demonstrates how a breakdown of trust is central to a nation's current predicament—and how our future depends on finding ways to instill confidence in the American project, and in each other.

References 

Pete Buttigieg
2020 non-fiction books
Boni & Liveright books